Sinan Kurumuş (born 2 August 1994) is a Turkish footballer who plays as a forward for Çorum FK.

Club career
He made his Süper Lig debut for Ankaragücü on 18 February 2012.

References

External links
 Player profile at TFF.org
 

1994 births
People from İnegöl
Living people
Turkish footballers
Turkey youth international footballers
Association football forwards
MKE Ankaragücü footballers
Beşiktaş J.K. footballers
Boluspor footballers
Kahramanmaraşspor footballers
Tepecikspor footballers
Bayrampaşaspor footballers
Pendikspor footballers
Kırklarelispor footballers
Hatayspor footballers
Manisa FK footballers
Tarsus Idman Yurdu footballers
Şanlıurfaspor footballers
Sakaryaspor footballers
Süper Lig players
TFF First League players
TFF Second League players